The following is a list of youth topics.

A
Activism
- Adolescent
- Adultcentrism
- Advertising to children
- Age of candidacy
- Age of consent
- Age of majority
- Alternative school
- American Youth Congress
- Article 12
- Australian Clearinghouse for Youth Studies
- Authoritarianism

B
Bar mitzvah - Bat mitzvah

C
Youth in Cambodia
- Child labor
- Child Labor Deterrence Act
- Child labor laws
- Child Labour Programme of Action
- Children's literature
- Children's rights
- Children's rights in Islam
- Children's rights movement
- Child-selling
- Child slavery
- Civic engagement
- Clique
- Closed adoption
- Cost of raising a child
- Club
- College
- Coming of age
- CommonAction
- Community youth development
- Company of Young Canadians
- Concerned for Working Children
- Confirmation
- Conscientious objector
- Contracts (right to sign)
- Convention on the Rights of the Child
- Corporal punishment
- Councils
- Crime
- Culture
- Curfews

D
Development (in general)
- Development (Community)
- Development (Positive)
- Declaration of the Rights of the Child
- Driving age
- Drinking age
- Dedovshchina
- Disciplinary institutions (Michael Foucault)
- Drama (television)

E
Ephebiphobia
- Empowerment
- Empowerment organizations
- Evolving Capacities
- Emancipation of minors
- Education
- Education reform
- Escape From Childhood
- Eternal youth
- European Free Alliance Youth
- European Youth Forum
- Evolving capacities

F
Fear of children
- Fear of youth
- Free school (disambiguation)
- Films
- Fagging
- Feral child
- Framing Youth
- The Freechild Project

G
Generations
- Generation gap
- Global/National Youth Service Day
- Gulag schools
- Graduation
- Generation YES
- Global Youth Action Network
- Green Youth (disambiguation), youth divisions of Green political parties
- Global/National Youth Service Day

H
History of Youth Rights in the United States
- High school
- Homeschooling
- Hazing
- Homelessness
- Higher education
- Hakfar Hayarok
- Youth in Hong Kong

I
Idols
- Impressment
- In loco parentis
- Intergenerational equity
- International Programme on the Elimination of Child Labour

J
Juvenile delinquency
- Juvenile justice

L
Leadership
- Leaving Certificate
- Literature
- Literacy
- Levée en masse
- Learn and Serve America
- Liberal Religious Youth
- List of books written by teenagers
- London matchgirls strike of 1888

M
Media by youth
- Medicine
- Menarche
- Medicine
- Mentoring
- Middle school
- Military use of children
- Ministry
- Mobile phone
- Movement
- Movies
- Music
- Military conscription

N
National Commission on Resources for Youth
- National Youth Administration
- National Youth Leadership Council
- National Youth Rights Association
- New Games Book
- The Newsboys Strike
- Not Back to School Camp

O
Optimism

P
Participation
- Partnerships with adults
- Participation
- Pastors (youth)
- Paternalism
- Pedagogy of the Oppressed
- Pedophobia
- Pedophilia
- Peacefire
- Psychology
- Peer pressure
- Politics
- Popular culture
- Port Huron Statement
- Positive youth development
- Pre-teen
- Pregnancy
- Programs
- Prostitution of children
- Protectionism
- Publications about youth
- Publications for youth
- Puberty
- Pubertal

Q
Quinceañera

R
Radical Youth
- Ragging
- Rebellion
- Rights
- Right-to-work laws
- Rite of passage
- Runaway youth

S
SDLP Youth
- Secondary education
- Seijin shiki
- Service
- Sex education 
- Sexuality in Britain
- Sexuality in India
- Sexuality in the United States
- Smoking age
- Sports
- Standardized test
- Student activism
- Student Nonviolent Coordinating Committee
- Student rights
- Students for a Democratic Society
- Students for Sensible Drug Policy
- Student voice
- Socialist Youth
- Subculture
- Suicide
- Sweet sixteen
- Scouts Australia

T
Taking Children Seriously
- Teenage pregnancy
- Teenage rebellion
- Television
- Technical school
- The Teenage Liberation Handbook
- Total institution

U 
Youth in Uganda
- University
- Unschooling
- Upanayanam

V
Video games
- Vocational education
- Voice (in general)
- Voice (in schools)
- Vote
- Voting age
- Voting rights

W
Waithood
- Wild in the Streets (movie)
- Work
- World Scout Committee
- Worst Forms of Child Labour Convention, 1999
- Worst Forms of Child Labour Recommendation

X

Y
Young adult fiction
- Youth
- Youth engagement
- Youth studies
- Youth activism
- Youth Activism Project
- Youth and disability
- Youth Assisting Youth
- Youth: The 26% Solution
- Youth club
- Youth council
- Youth culture
- Youth development
- Youth empowerment
- :Template:Youth Empowerment
- Youth For Equality
- Youth Health
- Youth leadership
- Youth Liberation of Ann Arbor
- Youth mentoring
- Youth ministry
- Youth movement
- Youth organizations
- Youth participation
- Youth philanthropy
- Youth politics
- Youth program
- Youth On Board
- Youth Radio
- Youth rights
- Youth service
- Youth Service America
- Youth voice
- Youth vote
- Youth work
- Youth/adult partnerships
- Youth-led media
- Youthfulness

Z
Zero tolerance (schools)

See also
List of articles related to youth rights
List of youth organizations

Youth
Adolescence
Youth topics